Palaivana Paravaigal is a 1990 Indian Tamil language crime film directed by Senthilnathan. The film stars Sarathkumar, Anandaraj, newcomer Udhayan and newcomer Dharini. It was released on 15 September 1990.

Plot 

Mamu and Machi, two orphans and heartless criminals, are sentenced to the death penalty. Raja, their cellmate, is an innocent youth who is in love with Kaveri. Mamu and Machi decide to save Raja and they go to his village before their death sentence.

Cast 

Sarathkumar as Mamu
Anandaraj as Machi
Udhayan as Raja
Dharini as Kaveri
Jaishankar as Sivaprakasam
Jayanthi
Senthil as Peruchali
Sampathkumar as Pannaiyar
Sethu Vinayagam as Advocate
Charuhasan
Senthilnathan
Kula Deivam V. R. Rajagopal
K. Natraj as Kannayiram
S. N. Lakshmi
Loose Mohan
Kovai Senthil
T. S. Raghavendra
A. K. Veerasami

Soundtrack 
The music was composed by Ilayagangai, with lyrics by Muthulingam, Piraisoodan, Sambaya and S. Kalayarasan.

References

External links 
 

1990 crime films
1990 films
1990s Tamil-language films
Films directed by Senthilnathan
Indian crime films